Caal is a surname. Notable people with the surname include:

Jakelin Caal (2011–2018), Guatemalan immigrant child
Oscar Valentín Leal Caal (1971–2012), Guatemalan politician

See also
Call (surname)